(English: Publisher Encyclopedia) was an East-German publishing house located in Leipzig. It was founded on 1 November 1956 by the German Democratic Republic (GDR) as a VEB. In 1964, the publishing house was merged with the larger  (BI), with which it had previously cooperated already, but it retained its legal independence.

 was originally intended to export works from nationalized encyclopedic publishers, but this plan failed. The publishing house then specialized in languages, its program included dictionaries, grammar books, language textbooks and phrasebooks as well as linguistic magazines.

A complete bibliographic catalog published by the publisher in 1981 listed 800 titles in 60 languages.

At the end of May 1991 it was sold to BIFAB Mannheim, and on 1 November 1991 it was resold to Langenscheidt.

References

Further reading
NB. This work is based on the author's dissertation at  under the title  in 2008.)

Volkseigene Betriebe
Publishing companies of Germany
Book publishing companies of Germany
Publishing companies established in 1956
Publishing companies disestablished in 1991